Ouargaye  is a department or commune of Koulpélogo Province in eastern Burkina Faso. Its capital is the town of Ouargaye. According to the 2019 census the department has a total population of 42,613.

Towns and villages

 Ouargaye (13 431 inhabitants) (capital)
 Babakou (406 inhabitants) 
 Bittin (1 150 inhabitants) 
 Boudoughin (794 inhabitants) 
 Dimtenga (1 490 inhabitants) 
 Kogo (1 171 inhabitants) 
 Konglore (1 953 inhabitants) 
 Koundoghin (1 631 inhabitants) 
 Lerghin (1 094 inhabitants) 
 Mene (4 016 inhabitants) 
 Naboudin (965 inhabitants) 
 Naganga (3 938 inhabitants) 
 Tessoaghin (1 251 inhabitants)

References

Departments of Burkina Faso
Koulpélogo Province